Yunnanilus beipanjiangensis is a species of ray-finned fish, a stone loach, in the genus Yunnanilus. Its type locality is the Beipanjiang River system, Yunnan Province, China.

References

B
Taxa named by Li Wie-Xian
Taxa named by Mao Wei-Ning
Taxa named by Sun Ron-Fu
Fish described in 1994